= Arthur Dexter =

English footballer (1905–1997)

Personal information
- Full name: Arthur Dexter
- Date of birth: 11 January 1905
- Place of birth: Nottingham, England
- Date of death: 1997 (aged 91–92)
- Height: 6 ft 0 in (1.83 m)
- Position: Goalkeeper

Senior career*
Years	Team	Apps	(Gls)
1920	Highbury Vale Methodists		
1920	Bulwell St Alban's		
1921	Vernon Athletic		
1921–1923	Stapleford Brookhill		
1923–1937	Nottingham Forest	256	(0)
Total		256	(0)
- * Club domestic league appearances and goals

Arthur Dexter (11 January 1905 – 1997) was an English footballer who played as a goalkeeper in the Football League for Nottingham Forest.
